Oxford is the Canadian arm of Pendaflex, and makes organizational filing solutions. It is owned by Esselte.

Oxford is also a brand from the French company Groupe Hamelin, selling stationery products.

Oxford (stationery) English website

Manufacturing companies of Canada